Ricarda Haaser (born 10 September 1993) is an Austrian alpine ski racer who competed at the 2018 Winter Olympics. 

At the World Championships in 2023, she took the bronze medal in the combined; her younger brother Raphael won the bronze in the men's combined the next day.

World Cup results

Season standings

Results per discipline

World Championship results

Olympic results

References

External links

1993 births
Living people
Austrian female alpine skiers
Alpine skiers at the 2018 Winter Olympics
Olympic alpine skiers of Austria
Sportspeople from Innsbruck
20th-century Austrian women
21st-century Austrian women